Hervé de Charette (born 30 July 1938 in Paris) is a French centrist politician. He is a descendant of the royalist military leader François de Charette and of king Charles X of France. Member of the Union for French Democracy (UDF), he was elected deputy for the first time in 1986 as representative of the Maine-et-Loire département. During the first cohabitation, from 1986 to 1988, he served as Minister of Civil Service, then, during the second, from 1993 to 1995, as Minister of Housing. In the UDF, he remained faithful to the leader Valéry Giscard d'Estaing. Like him, and contrary to the most part of the UDF politicians, he supported the winning candidacy of Jacques Chirac in the 1995 presidential election and not that of Prime Minister Édouard Balladur. In this, after the campaign, he found and led the Popular Party for French Democracy (PPDF), a component of the UDF, and served as Minister of Foreign Affairs until the defeat of the Presidential Majority in the 1997 legislative election. In 2002, he joined the Union for a Popular Movement (Union pour un mouvement populaire or UMP). In December 2009, he left this party for the Nouveau Centre.

References

External links

1938 births
Living people
Politicians from Paris
Republican Party (France) politicians
Union for French Democracy politicians
Democratic Convention (France) politicians
The Republicans (France) politicians
The Centrists politicians
French Foreign Ministers
HEC Paris alumni
École nationale d'administration alumni
Deputies of the 12th National Assembly of the French Fifth Republic
Deputies of the 13th National Assembly of the French Fifth Republic